Heissell De Los Ángeles Carcache Guandique (born April 4, 1985) is a female beach volleyball player from Nicaragua, who participated in the women's indoor competition at the 2002 Central American and Caribbean Games in San Salvador, El Salvador.

Beach Volley
Partnering Heidy Rostrán, she represented her native country at the 2007 NORCECA Beach Volleyball Circuit at Guatemala City. That year she also played the beach volleyball competition at the 2007 Pan American Games in Rio de Janeiro Brazil, with the same partner.

She also played the Guatemala and San Salvador legs from the NORCECA Beach Volleyball Circuit 2008 along with Heidy Traña.

References
 FIVB Profile
 

1985 births
Living people
Pan American Games competitors for Nicaragua
Beach volleyball players at the 2007 Pan American Games
Nicaraguan beach volleyball players
Nicaraguan women's volleyball players
Women's beach volleyball players